My Scene Goes Hollywood: The Movie is a 2005 American animated romantic comedy film based on Mattel's line of My Scene dolls. It features Barbie and American singer and actress Lindsay Lohan, who plays herself. It is the third feature with the My Scene characters, and the only one that was full-length. The film was directed by Eric Fogel. Although the title of the film suggests a trip to Hollywood, California, the entire plot takes place in New York City, where all the My Scene characters live. It was released by Buena Vista Home Entertainment under the Miramax Family label.

Plot 
The My Scene girls are attending high school in Manhattan when they find out there's a new teen spy movie called "Spy Society" being filmed there, starring Lindsay Lohan (who plays Laural St. Clair, the lead character) and fictional character Ryan Ridley (who plays Lohan's love interest in the movie). While the girls, Barbie, Chelsea, Madison, Nolee and Delancey, go to watch the movie being filmed, they get the idea to sneak onto the set by pretending to be extras.

While working as extras for the movie, the girls quickly learn that there's a lot of work that goes into making a movie, such as getting to the set early in the morning, doing hours and hours of takes on a scene and Chelsea keeps getting terrible roles such as sweat girl, trash girl and even being forced to clean up after the horses that are being used in the movie. The girls imagine themselves becoming best friends with Lindsay Lohan, who turns out to be nice and down-to-earth (and who they do end up becoming friends with).

When one of the actresses gets hurt on their way to the set and is unable to play her part, Madison's called in to take her place. The actress she's replacing plays the movie's lead female villain, although the character only has five speaking lines.

After a while, the fame starts going to Madison's head. She begins thinking that she and Ryan are dating as they always go out together and the tabloids refer to her as "Ryan's Mystery Girl." When Madison gets invited to a party with Ryan and Lindsay, her friends show up to surprise her. However, Madison is very rude to them, pretending that she doesn’t know them. She starts acting and dressing like a diva, and avoids her lifelong friends. This causes her friends to become mad at her and start avoiding Madison as well.

When the shooting is about to wrap in New York, Madison asks Ryan how they will handle their relationship. Ryan's surprised to hear her say this and admits that he doesn't see Madison as his girlfriend, leaving Madison heartbroken at the realization that Ryan was never going to feel the same way about her as she did about him. Lindsay witnesses this and goes to tell the other girls about it—but they are still mad at Madison for how she treated them and don't seem to care, feeling that she deserves it. Upset, Lindsay briefly lectures the girls about the importance of friendship, pointing out that despite everything that's happened between them and Madison, she needs them now more than ever. Hearing this, the girls get over their anger towards Madison and go to her apartment, where they all apologize to each other and make amends.

In the end, six months later, the girls all go to the red carpet premiere of the movie, where they meet up with Lindsay. After Ryan arrives at the premiere, he tries getting Madison and Lindsay's attention but they ignore him and go to watch the movie with their friends.

Cast 
 Kelly Sheridan as Barbie 
 Kathleen Barr as Madison (named Westley in Europe)
 Tegan Moss as Nolee
 Meghan Black as Delancey
 Nicole Bouma as Chelsea
 Brenda Crichlow as Audra
 Mark Hildreth as Sutton
 Alessandro Juliani as River
 Terry Klassen as Jim
 Shane Meier as Ellis
 Kirby Morrow as Hudson
 Samuel Vincent as Ryan
 Ashleigh Ball as Kenzie
 Lindsay Lohan as Herself
 Harvey Weinstein as Himself
 Aden Hakimi as Paparazzi (uncredited)

Soundtrack 
There is no album made for the songs played in the movie.

 Lucky - Leslie Mills 
 I Feel Like L.A. - Leslie Mills
 Find the Fun - Leslie Mills
 Playground (Instrumental)
 Find the Fun (Instrumental)
 Starlight - Leslie Mills
 Lucky (Reprise)
 Playground - Andrea Remanda

Reception 
My Scene Goes Hollywood: The Movie earned negative reviews.

Lacey Worrell of DVDTalk gave the movie a negative review, writing that "The plot of this movie is paper-thin, made even more nauseating by frequent mention of teen queen and guest voiceover artist Lindsay Lohan, who at this point in her career is overexposed at best, her drama-fueled personal life having overshadowed her acting talents. Revolving around the cliché of friends-forever, it's nothing you that hasn't already been done many, many times by Mary-Kate and Ashley Olsen. And the acting is just as wooden. The message also appears to be that, regardless of skin color or ethnic background, everyone can be just as vacuous as Barbie!" She ended the review saying "Not all entertainment aimed at children needs to be educational, because let's face it, adults seek escape through entertainment all the time. But the entire presentation of this DVD is vapid and unrealistic; it goes beyond superficial and into the inane. How about a little substance with the style next time?".

References

External links 
 
 

2005 direct-to-video films
Barbie films
Animated films set in New York City
Direct-to-video animated films
2000s American animated films
American direct-to-video films
Buena Vista Home Entertainment direct-to-video films
2005 animated films
Miramax animated films
2000s English-language films
Films directed by Eric Fogel